Northern Lakes College is a publicly funded comprehensive community college in northern Alberta, Canada.

Administrative offices are located in Slave Lake and Grouard, Alberta, with a staff of more than 275 working in more than 25 community campuses. The college connects students from throughout the region with the latest in real-time teaching and learning technology to create manageable class cohorts.

The college is a member of the Alberta Rural Development Network.

Education programs 
The college offers education and training programs that include: trades and apprenticeship, career education, university studies and work force development. Career choices include the following:
 Business Administration
 Community Liaison
 Forestry
 Health Care
 Office Administration
 Paramedicine
 Petroleum
 Power Engineering
 Practical Nurse
 Production Field Operations
 Rehabilitation Therapy
 Social Work
 Teaching

Locations 
The following communities are served by Northern Lakes College:

Athabasca
Atikameg
Barrhead
Cadotte Lake
Calling Lake
Driftpile
East Prairie
Fairview
Flatbush
Fort Vermilion

Gift Lake
Grande Prairie
Grouard
High Level
High Prairie
La Crete
Manning
Marten Lakes
Paddle Prairie

Peace River
Peavine
Peerless Lake
Slave Lake
Wabasca
Swan Hills
Trout Lake
Valleyview

History
In 1970 and 1971, in Grouard, Alberta, First Nations students received adult education basic training to prepare to become instructors in Community Vocational Centres (CVC's) area.

In 1988 the Alberta Vocational Centre in Grouard amalgamated with a network of 26 community vocational centres for First Nations students in northern Alberta to form the Alberta Vocational College. The governance of the converted into a college governed by a public board from a provincially administered school on September 1, 1997.

The current name, Northern Lakes College, replaced the name Alberta Vocational College on August 25, 1999.

See also 
 Education in Alberta
 List of universities and colleges in Alberta

References

External links 
 Northern Lakes College

Educational institutions established in 1999
Vocational education in Canada
Colleges in Alberta
1999 establishments in Alberta